George Warburton (born 13 September 1934) is a Welsh former professional footballer who played as a right back.

Career
Born in Brymbo, Warburton began his career with local clubs Pentre Broughton and Brymbo Steelworks. He then made 36 appearances in the Football League for Wrexham and Barrow between 1957 and 1961, before playing non-league football with Morecambe and Netherfield, before ending his career back in Wales with Holywell Town, Colwyn Bay and Blaenau Ffestiniog Amateur.

References

1934 births
Living people
Welsh footballers
Brymbo F.C. players
Wrexham A.F.C. players
Barrow A.F.C. players
Morecambe F.C. players
Kendal Town F.C. players
Holywell Town F.C. players
Colwyn Bay F.C. players
Blaenau Ffestiniog Amateur F.C. players
English Football League players
Association football fullbacks